Zhu Lin may refer to:

 Zhu Lin (official), circuit intendant of Shanghai under the Qing
 Zhu Lin (politician) (1920–2021), Chinese politician
 Zhu Lin (politician) (born 1933), wife of former Chinese Premier Li Peng 
 Zhu Lin (actress) (born 1952), Chinese film actress
 Zhu Lin (novelist) (born 1949), Chinese novelist
 Zhu Lin (badminton) (born 1984), Chinese badminton player
 Zhu Lin (tennis) (born 1994), Chinese tennis player